Lil Weavah is an American writer and producer of television shows. He has also appeared on MTV and Showtime.



Biography 
Early in his career, Weavah produced features on major network television stations such as MTV. His initial role was a Showtime reality based series titled 16 Bars. After corporate sponsors backed out due to budget restrictions, most of the production and footage from the show became promotional materials. 

As a writer, he mostly directs stage plays. These plays often reflect political or religious topics. In 2008, he played the lead role in a college drama titled The Exonerated where he played the role of Delbert Tibbs. Later in 2008, he played the character Thomas Brown in the religious drama titled "Note to God". In 2009, he played a lead role in the Gospel stage play titled "Power of One". In 2012, he co-produced another Religious drama titled "Love Others".

External links 
Lil Weavah's official site

American writers about music
American male actors
Living people
Year of birth missing (living people)